The Scottish Fashion Awards was an annual awards ceremony honouring Scottish designers, photographers, models and fashion industry leaders. Founded in 2006, the event organiser was Tessa Hartmann, owner of a Scottish-based PR firm to promote her clients and their friends. Their mission is "...to provide an outstanding platform for Scottish creatives, from designers and photographers, to models, fashion communicators and industry leaders."

Awards events

2006

The inaugural event was held at Stirling Castle with GMTV presenter Jenni Falconer acting as emcee. Entertainment was provided by Sandi Thom and electric fiddle player Laura McPhee.

The winners were:
 Designer of the Year - Jonathan Saunders
 Model of the Year - Kirsty Hume
 Young Designer - Christopher Kane
 Textiles/Cashmere Designer - Jennifer Lang
 Communicator of the Year - Joe McKenna
 Fashion Icon - Lulu
 Retailer of the Year - USC
 International Designer of the Year - Viktor & Rolf
 Hall of Fame - Albert Watson

2007

Jenni Falconer once again hosted the event which was held at Stirling Castle on 9 September. The judges included Kate Phelan, fashion director of British Vogue, and Jennifer Uner, founder of the Los Angeles Fashion Show.

Winners included:
 Designer of the Year - Christopher Kane
 Retailer of the Year - Schuh
 Fashion Icon - Sharleen Spiteri of the group ‘Texas’

2008

The third annual event was held at Stirling Castle on 29 June.

The winners were:
 Designer of the Year - Christopher Kane
 Lifetime Achievement Award/Hall of Fame - Sam McKnight
 Best Use of Tartan - Henry Holland
 Model of the Year - Emily McWilliams
 Young Designer of the Year - Graeme Armour
 Textiles Brand of the Year - Johnstons of Elgin
 Communicator of the Year - David Eustace
 Fashion Icon - Darius Danesh
 Retailer of the Year - Norton & Sons
 Accessory Designer of the Year - Bebaroque Hoisery
 Best Use of Tartan - House of Holland

2009

The 2009 event was held in Stirling Castle in June with Graeme Black, Siouxsie Sioux and Pam Hogg providing entertainment. The judging panel included GANT creative director Brian Rennie, Vogue.com editor Dolly Jones and Janette Harkess, deputy editor of The Herald.

The winners were:
 Hall of Fame - Pam Hogg
 Designer of the Year - Graeme Black
 Textile Brand of the Year - Harris Tweed Hebrides
 Young Designer of the Year - Holly Fulton
 Retailer of the Year - Ultimo
 Model of the Year - Gillian Cook, The Model Team
 Communicator of the Year - Nick Ede
 Graduate of the Year - Neil Young, Central St Martins
 Accessory/Jewellery Designer of the Year - Joyce Paton
 Best Use of Scottish Fabric - Paul Smith
 Style Icon - Jenni Falconer
 New Face - Christina Chalk

2010

On 20 June, after four years at Stirling Castle, the event was moved to the Glasgow Science Centre and was hosted by Laura Whitmore. The judges included Brian Duffy, (president of Ralph Lauren Europe), Nathalie Colin (creative director of Swarovski), designer Amanda Wakeley, Professor Wendy Dagworthy (Fashion & Textiles at the Royal College of Art), Brigitte Stepputis (head of couture at Vivienne Westwood), Robert Johnston (associate editor of GQ) and VOGUE.COM's editor Dolly Jones.

The winners were:
 Designer of the Year - Jonathan Saunders
 Young Designer of the Year - Holly Fulton
 Accessory Designer of the Year - William Chambers
 Model of the Year - Lisa Omond
 International Designer of the Year/Best Use of Scottish Textile - Markus Lupfer
 Fashion Hall of Fame - Malcolm Edwards
 Fashion Icon - Paolo Nutini
 Communicator of the Year - Eilidh McAskill
 Retailer of the Year - Cruise
 New Face - Terri McGlone
 Graduate of the Year - Jett Sweeney

2011

The 2011 event was again held in the Glasgow Science Centre and was once again hosted by Laura Whitmore.

The winners were:
 Designer of the Year - Jonathan Saunders
 Young Designer of the Year - Henrietta Ludgate
 Scottish Retailer of the Year - Rox
 International Designer of the Year - House of Holland
 Fashion Icon - Freya Mavor
 Fashion Graduate of the Year - Campbell Dunn
 Scottish Textile Brand of the Year - Harris Tweed Hebrides

2012

The event was held at Glasgow's Clyde Auditorium.

The winners were:
 Designer of the Year - Christopher Kane 
 Young Designer of the Year - Hayley Scanlan
 Fashion Ambassador - Colin McDowell
 Hall of Fame - Stella Tennant
 Textile Brand of the Year - Dashing Tweeds
 Accessory Designer of the Year - William Chambers
 Fashion Icon - Karen Gillan
 Communicator of the Year - Faye McLeod
 Model of the Year - Tali Lennox
 Retailer of the Year - Shhh-Oohs
 Fashion Photographer - Jonathan Daniel Pryce
 New Face - Kerry O'May
 Graduate of the Year - Joanne McGillivary from Herriot Watt, David Black was awarded a high commended certificate.
 International Designer of the Year (for use of a Scottish fabric) - Mulberry
 Fashion Innovator - Brian Rennie, creative director of Basler

2013

The event was held at London's Dover House with Laura Whitmore returning as the host.

The winners were:
 Scottish Designer of the Year - Christopher Kane
 International Designer of the Year (For Best Use of Scottish Fabric) - Chanel
 Model of the Year - Mary Charteris
 Fashion Icon - Emeli Sandé
 Creative Excellence Award - Pam Hogg
 Innovator of the Year - Louise Gray
 Young Designer of the Year - Jennifer Morris
 Textile Designer of the Year - Alice Palmer
 Retailer of the Year - Schuh
 Communicator of the Year - Penny Martin
 Accessory Designer of the Year - Finlay & Co.

2014

The event was held in London on 1 September with Laura Whitmore returning as host.

The winners were:
 Designer of the Year - Christopher Kane
 Young Designer of the Year - Hayley Scanlan
 Textile Brand of the Year - Dhu
 Communicator of the Year - Avril Mair, Harper's Bazaar
 Retailer of the Year - Abandon Ship Apparel
 Accessory Designer of the Year - William Chambers Millinery
 Fashion Graduate of the Year - Colleen Leitch
 International Designer of the Year - Simone Rocha
 Model of the Year - Jean Campbell
 Exporter of the Year - Mackintosh
 Luxury Retailer - Harvey Nichols, Edinburgh
 Fashion Icon 2014 - Amy Macdonald
 Hall of Fame 2014 - Dame Vivienne Westwood
 Fashion Ambassador 2014 - Professor Christopher Moore on behalf of Professor Pamela Gillies, British School of Fashion and Belinda Earle on behalf of Marc Bolland, Marks & Spencer
 Founders Awards 2014 - David Gandy

2015

The 2015 event was held at the Corinthia Hotel in London on 3 September 2015.

The winners were:

 Designer of the Year - Christopher Kane
 Scottish Textile Brand / Manufacturer of the Year - Barrie Knitwear
 Communicator of the Year - Lynsey Alexander (Make Up Artist)
 Young Designer of the Year - Cats Brothers
 Fashion Graduate of the Year - Charles Jeffrey (Central Saint Martins)
 Retailer of the Year - Walker Slater
 Model of the Year - Misha Hart (VIVA Model Management)
 Accessory Designer of the Year - Hunter Boot Ltd
 Fashion Philanthropist - Nick Ede
 Fashion Icon - Connor Ball (The Vamps)
 Luxury Retailer of the Year - Belstaff (Glasgow)
 International Designer (for best use of Scottish fabric) - Topman 
 Founders Award - Pringle of Scotland
 Hall of Fame - David Eustace

Reception
In 2011, the blogsite World Fashion Awards described the Scottish Fashion Awards as a "...globally recognised tartan carpet." In 2014, Vogue stated that the awards highlight Scotland's "...substantial contribution to the fashion industry." 

When the 2014 nominees were announced, Alistair Carmichael (Secretary of State for Scotland) stated, "These awards are now recognized around the world as the benchmark of success within the global fashion community and are without a doubt the most high-profile showcase of Scottish fashion, design and textile talent in the country."

See also

 List of fashion awards

References 

Fashion awards 
Awards established in 2006 
Annual events in the United Kingdom